Julius Sterling Morton (April 22, 1832 – April 27, 1902) was a Nebraska newspaper editor and politician who served as President Grover Cleveland's Secretary of Agriculture. He was a prominent Bourbon Democrat, taking a conservative position on political, economic, and social issues, and opposing agrarianism. Among his most notable achievements was the founding of Arbor Day in 1872. In 1897 he started a weekly magazine entitled The Conservative.

Early life
Morton was born on April 22, 1832, in the town of Adams in Jefferson County, New York; his parents, Julius Dewey Morton and Emeline Sterling Morton, ran a general store. In 1834, his parents and his grandfather, Abner Morton, moved to Monroe, Michigan, south of Detroit on Lake Erie; there, Morton's grandfather and his paternal uncle Edward Morton operated a newspaper.

In 1850, Morton enrolled in the University of Michigan.  In his junior year he attempted to launch a new periodical, the Peninsular Quarterly and University Magazine, which proved short-lived.  He was an active member of the Chi Psi fraternity, and opposed an attempt by the faculty to discourage such secret societies.

In May 1854, six weeks before Morton was due to graduate, the university's Board of Regents dismissed the head of the medical department, Dr. J. Adams Allen, a popular faculty member. That evening, Morton, a friend and admirer of Allen's, addressed a mass meeting protesting Allen's dismissal and other seemingly autocratic actions taken by university officials.  The following day, Morton was expelled from the university, ostensibly for excessive absences and for general inattention to his duties as a student.  His expulsion prompted protests from the student body and across the state. He was readmitted after signing a very conditional document, stating that if the charges against him had been true, then his expulsion would have been justified. The readmission did not last. The university president, Henry Philip Tappan, released a version of his statement from which the conditionals had been removed, making it a straightforward admission of fault. Morton wrote a letter to the Detroit Free Press in which he retracted his original statement, declaring that he had not "...meanly petitioned, implored and besought the Faculty for mercy, for... the Latin-scratched integument of a dead sheep."  He was re-expelled and not allowed to graduate with his class. In 1856, under unclear circumstances, he was awarded an honorary Bachelor of Arts degree by Union College of Schenectady, New York; in 1858, the University of Michigan faculty reversed his expulsion and awarded him a diploma.

Nebraska

At the age of 22, in fall 1854, he moved with his bride, Caroline Joy French, to the Nebraska Territory, and in 1855 purchased 160 acres in Nebraska City. Soon after arriving there, Morton became the editor of the local newspaper, the Nebraska City News. Morton served briefly in the Nebraska Territorial House of Representatives (1855–1856).  He was appointed Secretary of Nebraska Territory by President James Buchanan on July 12, 1858, a position he held until 1861.  The 26 year old Morton also served as Acting Governor of Nebraska from December 5, 1858, to May 2, 1859.

In 1860, Morton ran for the office of Delegate to the U.S. House of Representatives from Nebraska. He was originally named the winner by 14 votes and issued a certificate of election by the Governor, but 7 months later and two months after his term began, the Governor issued a superseding certificate of election to his opponent, Samuel Gordon Daily. When the session of Congress began, after some debate, it was decided that Daily should be sworn in, not Morton. Morton contested the outcome, noting that the Governor issued the second certificate in secret, without the concurrence of the Board of Canvassers and without the proper seal. Some said that Daily's certificate was a forgery, but the House having already decided to seat Daily chose not to litigate it. The House reviewed the election returns and rejected many votes, mostly for Morton. In the end they found that Daily had won by 150 votes.

Morton built a 30-room mansion. His son, Joy, expanded it to a 52-room mansion that is a look-alike of the White House in what is now Arbor Lodge State Historical Park, Nebraska City, Nebraska. On the surrounding estate, Morton indulged his fascination with trees, planting many rare varieties and heirloom apple trees.  Respected as an agriculturalist, Morton sought to instruct people in the modern techniques of farming and forestry. Among his most significant achievements was the founding of Arbor Day. He is also remembered for his support of slavery and his fierce opposition to cutting down healthy trees as Christmas decorations. He became well known in Nebraska for his political, agricultural, and literary activities and from there was appointed as United States Secretary of Agriculture by President Cleveland (1893–1897). He is credited with helping change that department into a coordinated service to farmers, and he supported Cleveland in setting up national forest reservations.

In 1897, Morton planned and began to edit the multi-volume Illustrated History of Nebraska. He also began publishing a weekly periodical, The Conservative. Morton died on April 27, 1902 in Lake Forest, Illinois, where he was seeking medical treatment; his wife, Caroline, had died two decades earlier, in June 1881.  The Morton home and estate in Nebraska City is now a state park, the Arbor Lodge State Historical Park and Arboretum.

In 1937, the state of Nebraska donated a bronze statue of Morton to the National Statuary Hall Collection at the United States Capitol. Morton is a member of the Nebraska Hall of Fame. The J. Sterling Morton Beltway, a highway near Nebraska City, Nebraska, which is made up of U.S. Route 75 and Nebraska Highway 2, is named for him. J. Sterling Morton Magnet Middle School in Omaha, Nebraska, also bears his name, as do Morton College (a community college) and J. Sterling Morton High School District 201 in Berwyn and Cicero, Illinois.

His son Joy Morton was the founder of the Morton Salt Company, Chicago, Illinois.  The son also created The Morton Arboretum in Lisle, Illinois in 1922.  Today, Joy Morton's original  Thornhill Estate, which he acquired in 1910, has been transformed into a  living history museum of over 4,000 different types of trees, shrubs, and other woody plants.

His son, Paul Morton, was the Vice President of the Santa Fe Railroad and President of the Equitable Life Insurance Company, and although J. Sterling was a Bourbon Democrat (i.e. conservative Democrat), Paul served as Secretary of the Navy under Teddy Roosevelt from 1904 to 1905 as a Progressive Republican.

Notes

References
 Beaty, Sandy (1998).  Champion of Arbor Day: J. Sterling Morton.  Kansas City, Missouri: Acorn Books.
 Olson, James C. (1942).  J. Sterling Morton.  Lincoln, Nebraska: Nebraska State Historical Society Foundation.

External links

The Arbor Day Foundation at www.arborday.org
 at the Nebraska State Historical Society

|-

|-

|-

|-

|-

1832 births
1902 deaths
American conservationists
Members of the Nebraska Territorial Legislature
19th-century American politicians
Governors of Nebraska Territory
Politicians from Detroit
People from Monroe, Michigan
University of Michigan alumni
People from Nebraska City, Nebraska
People from Adams, New York
United States Secretaries of Agriculture
People of Nebraska in the American Civil War
19th-century American Episcopalians
20th-century American Episcopalians
Cleveland administration cabinet members
History of forestry in the United States
Nebraska Democrats
Activists from New York (state)
Bourbon Democrats